State decorations awarded by Thai King take the form of orders and medals. This page lists them by order of precedence.

Royal decorations
 Royal orders 

 Order of precedence

Royal medals

Medals for acts of bravery

Medals for service to the nation

Medals for service to the monarch

Medals for commemorative occasions

Thai Red Cross Society medals

See also
 Pavilion of Regalia, Royal Decorations and Coins
 List of honours of Thailand awarded to heads of state and royalty

References

External links

 Office of the Prime Minister's Regulation of the Wearing of the Royal Thai Decorations (1998)
 Order of Precedence Office of the Prime Minister, Thailand

 
Thailand-related lists